Events in the year 1809 in Art.

Events
 Six students of the Academy of Fine Arts Vienna form an artistic cooperative called the Brotherhood of St. Luke (Lukasbund), predecessor of the Nazarene movement.

Works

Pietro Benvenuti – Elisa Bonaparte surrounded by the artists of Florence
John Constable – Malvern Hall
John Singleton Copley – George, Prince of Wales, on horseback
Jacques-Louis David – Sappho and Phaon
Caspar David Friedrich – Mönch am Meer
Thomas Douglas Guest
The Transfiguration
Venus recumbent and Cupids
Orest Kiprensky
Portrait of Countess Ye. P. Rostopchina
Portrait of Yevgraf Davydov
Charles Willson Peale – The Peale Family
Henry Raeburn – Mrs Spiers
Richard Westmacott – Statue of Horatio Nelson, Birmingham

Births
February 15  – Owen Jones, British architect, interior designer, and pioneer of chromolithography (died 1874)
March 1 – Robert Cornelius, American pioneer of photography (died 1893)
March 23 – Jean-Hippolyte Flandrin, French painter (died 1864)
April 17 – Thomas Brigstocke, Welsh portrait painter (died 1881)
May 5 – Frederick Langenheim, German American pioneer of panoramic photography (died 1879)
May 20 – Albert Newsam, American artist (died 1864)
August 28 – Giovanni Maria Benzoni, Italian sculptor (died 1873)
October 9 – Thomas Baker "of Leamington", English landscape painter (died 1864)
December 24 (bapt.) – Mary Thornycroft, English sculptor (died 1895)

Deaths
January 3 – Henri-Pierre Danloux, French painter (born 1753)
January 7 – Johann Peter Alexander Wagner, Rococo sculptor (born 1730)
February 23 – Dirk van der Aa, Dutch painter (born 1731)
March 7 – Pierre-Philippe Choffard, French draughtsman and engraver (born 1731)
March 23 – Étienne Dantoine, French sculptor (born 1737)
March 27 – Joseph-Marie Vien, French painter (born 1716)
April 6 – Jean-Pierre Saint-Ours, Swiss painter (born 1752)
May 8 – Augustin Pajou, French sculptor (born 1730)
June 4 – Nikolaj Abraham Abildgaard, Danish Neoclassicist painter (born 1743)
September 1 – Pierre-Joseph Lion, Belgian painter (born 1729)
November 9 – Paul Sandby, map-maker turned landscape painter in watercolours (born 1731)
November 11 – Jean-Joseph Taillasson, French painter (born 1745)
 date unknown
 Immanuel Alm, Finnish painter of primarily religious-themed works (born 1767)
 Jonathan Fisher, Irish painter (born unknown)

References

 
Years of the 19th century in art
1800s in art